Mirza Faiz Muhammad, also known by his title of Azādud Daulah, was an Indian nobleman and official in the Mughal empire during the 18th century. He was a descendant of Mirza Hadi Baig and the great-great grandfather of Mirza Ghulam Ahmad of Qadian.

Life and reign
During Faiz Muhammad's life, Qadian had developed close relations with Delhi. Faiz Muhammad was successful in suppressing the anarchy that prevailed in the Punjab during this period as a result of which, in 1716, the Mughal Emperor Farrukhsiyar conferred upon him the rank of Haft Hazārī which authorised him to keep regular force of 7,000 soldiers. He was also conferred the title Azādud Daulah (Strong Arm of the Government) by the Emperor.

References

Mughal generals
Indian people of Turkic descent
Indian Muslims